Exshaw is a surname. Notable people with the surname include:

 Charles Exshaw (died 1771), Irish painter and engraver
 William Exshaw (1866–1927), British sailor